American Wedding (known as American Pie 3: The Wedding or American Pie: The Wedding, in some countries) is a 2003 American sex comedy film written by Adam Herz and directed by Jesse Dylan. It is the sequel to American Pie (1999) and American Pie 2 (2001), and the third and intended final installment of the American Pie theatrical series. This was to be the last film in the franchise, ending it as a trilogy; however, a third theatrical sequel, American Reunion, was released nine years later, while the franchise expanded into a series of direct-to-DVD standalone sequels, under the umbrella title American Pie Presents, that began with the release of Band Camp (2005).

The film's main plot focuses on the wedding ceremony of Jim Levenstein (Jason Biggs) and Michelle Flaherty (Alyson Hannigan), while its subplot centers on Steve Stifler (Seann William Scott), and his outrageous antics including his attempt to organize a bachelor party, teaching Jim to dance for the wedding, and competing with Finch (Eddie Kaye Thomas) to win the heart of Michelle's sister, Cadence (January Jones).

It is the last film in the series to be written by Herz, who conceptualized the franchise, and also the only theatrical film in the series in which Chris Klein (Oz), Chris Owen (Sherman), Mena Suvari (Heather), Tara Reid (Vicky), Shannon Elizabeth (Nadia) and Natasha Lyonne (Jessica) do not appear.

Plot
Jim Levenstein prepares to propose to Michelle at a restaurant when his dad calls to tell him he has the ring. She misinterprets when Jim stalls the question and his dad arrives as he is receiving fellatio from under the table. The mishap grasps everyone's attention but Jim still proposes and Michelle accepts.

Jim wishes to exclude Steve Stifler from the wedding, who becomes upset when he finds out. Stifler agrees to teach Jim how to dance if he is allowed at the wedding. Jim asks Stifler to mask his obnoxious personality in exchange for planning the bachelor party.

Jim, Stifler, Paul Finch, and Kevin Myers travel to Chicago to find the designer who makes the dress Michelle wants. Stifler inadvertently walks into a gay bar, and his initially raucous behavior gets several patrons annoyed. Battling Bear in a dance-off, Stifler is offered strippers by him for the bachelor party. Dress designer Leslie reveals himself and agrees to make the dress for Michelle.

Michelle's younger sister, Cadence, flies in for the wedding. Both Finch and Stifler are attracted to her, and, trying to win her over, they each act differently. Stifler arranges the bachelor party but does not tell Jim, who unknowingly invited Michelle's parents to dinner in his home. With assistance from Bear, who poses as a butler, Jim nearly succeeds in keeping the bachelor's party a secret, until Michelle's mother opens a closet door to find Kevin inside; blindfolded, stripped to his boxers, and tied to a chair. They explain that it was a failed attempt to make Jim seem like a hero, and Michelle's parents tell him if he puts that much effort into the upcoming marriage, they can give their blessing.

Michelle is concerned that Jim's paternal grandmother disapproves of the wedding as she is not Jewish. On the night before the wedding, Stifler inadvertently turns off the walk-in refrigerator while getting a bottle of champagne to seduce Cadence, which kills the flowers. Stifler finally reveals his true rude and obnoxious personality. Angry, Jim asks him to leave, and all the others, including Cadence (who has heard him talking about doing her), support Jim's decision.

Feeling guilty for his thoughtless behavior, Stifler convinces the florist to put together a new batch of flowers, and he enlists the help of his football players and Bear. As a gesture of remorse, he also gives a rose to Cadence. Moved by his actions, she agrees to have sex with him in a supply closet before the ceremony, but Stifler's presence is delayed by a brief meeting Jim calls among his groomsmen, citing how he is grateful to have friends like them. 

Quickly returning to the hotel, Stifler hears someone in the supply closet and steps inside, unaware that Cadence was interrupted by wedding preparations and that Jim's disgruntled grandmother was shoved inside by the ushers, the "MILF guys" from high school. Stifler only realizes this upon walk-in by Finch and Kevin. She becomes pleasant, particularly towards Stifler, making Michelle and Jim's dad happy.

Despite the chaotic events leading up to it, Michelle and Jim get married. At the reception, the couple dances while Stifler dances with Cadence. Finch sits by himself when Stifler's mom arrives. Although agreeing they are over each other, Stifler's mom mentions having a hotel suite and invites Finch to join her. The film ends with the "MILF guys" (Justin and John) spying on Stifler's mom and Finch having sex in the hot tub.

Cast

Production 
The outdoor wedding scene was filmed at the Ritz-Carlton Half Moon Bay near San Francisco.

Soundtrack
The film's soundtrack includes songs by Van Morrison, Blue October, The Working Title, Foo Fighters, Feeder, Avril Lavigne, American Hi-Fi, Sum 41, the All-American Rejects, Joseph Arthur, New Found Glory, and Hot Action Cop. Everclear,  Badly Drawn Boy and The Libertines also have songs in the feature. Note that most songs used were already singles. And, this is the first film to feature the song "Laid" (Matt Nathanson covering the band James) in both the trailers and the opening sequence. Notably, it is also the only film in the series to not play the song "Mrs. Robinson" in a scene where Finch has sex with Stifler's mother. 

The song "Into the Mystic", played at the end of the film when Jim and Michelle take to the dance floor at the reception, begins as Van Morrison's recording, but midway through it changes to The Wallflowers' cover version due to licensing reasons.  The band's lead singer Jakob Dylan is the brother of the film's director Jesse Dylan.

The film's soundtrack peaked at number 23 on the Billboard 200 chart.

Songs that appear during Stifler's dance in the gay bar:
 "Beat It" - Michael Jackson (only few seconds)
 "Maniac" - Michael Sembello
 "Heaven Is a Place on Earth" - Belinda Carlisle
 "Sweet Dreams (Are Made of This)" - Eurythmics
 "Venus" - Bananarama
 "The Reflex" - Duran Duran
 "Round Round" - Sugababes

Songs that appear during the bachelor party:
"Summertime Girls" - Baha Men
"Freakin You" - Jungle Brothers

Release
American Wedding was released in the United States on August 1, 2003, and opened at #1 with $33,369,440 before dropping 53.7% the next weekend, landing at #3 behind the new releases of S.W.A.T. and Freaky Friday. Closing about 3.5 months later (November 20, 2003), the film had grossed a domestic total of $104,565,114 and $126,884,089 overseas for a worldwide total of $231,449,203, based on a $55 million budget.  Despite being a huge box office success, it is the lowest-grossing film in the series, making roughly $3 million less than American Reunion would in 2012.

American Wedding grossed $15.85 million on DVD and was the number seven DVD rental in 2004.

Reception
American Wedding received mixed reviews from critics. Rotten Tomatoes, a review aggregator, assigns the film a rating of 54%, based on 155 reviews, with an average rating of 5.8/10. The site's critical consensus reads, "Raunchier and even more gross than the first two American Pies, American Wedding ought to please fans of the series."  On Metacritic, the film has a score of 43 out of 100, based on 34 critics, which indicates "mixed or average reviews".

Robert Koeler of Variety compared it to the works of John Waters and called it a "strong finish" for the franchise.  Roger Ebert rated it 3/4 stars and wrote that the film "is proof of the hypothesis that no genre is beyond redemption."  Elvis Mitchell of The New York Times wrote that the film "struggles so hard to be tasteless that it's almost quaint."  Mick LaSalle of the San Francisco Chronicle rated it 2/5 stars and called it strained and desperate to find jokes.

Awards
Wins
 2004 - MTV Movie Award for Best Dance Sequence (Seann William Scott)
 2004 - Teen Choice Award for Choice Movie Villain (Seann William Scott) and Choice Movie Your Parents Didn't Want You To See

Nominations
 2004 - Teen Choice Award for Choice Movie – Comedy, Choice Movie Actor – Comedy (Seann William Scott), Choice Movie Actress – Comedy (Alyson Hannigan), Choice Movie Blush (Seann William Scott), Choice Movie Hissy Fit (Jason Biggs), & Choice Movie Liplock (Jason Biggs & Alyson Hannigan)

References

External links

 
 
 
 
 
 
 

American Pie (film series)
2003 films
2003 romantic comedy films
2000s sex comedy films
American romantic comedy films
American sequel films
American sex comedy films
2000s English-language films
Films scored by Christophe Beck
Films directed by Jesse Dylan
Films set in Michigan
Films shot in California
Films shot in Chicago
Films set in 2003
Films about weddings in the United States
American interfaith romance films
Films with screenplays by Adam Herz
Universal Pictures films
2000s American films